Nesciothemis is a genus of dragonflies in the family Libellulidae. It contains the following species:

Nesciothemis farinosa  - Black-tailed Dancer, Black-tailed False-skimmer, Black-tailed Skimmer, Common Blacktail (not to be confused with the Eurasian species Orthetrum cancellatum which shares some of these common names).
Nesciothemis fitzgeraldi 
Nesciothemis minor  - Small Blacktail
Nesciothemis nigeriensis  - Northern Redtail
Nesciothemis pujoli  - Western Blacktail

References

Libellulidae
Anisoptera genera
Taxonomy articles created by Polbot